Karin Boyd (born 1953 in Berlin) is a German actress and Theatre director.

Life and career 
Boyd was born in 1953 in Berlin. Boyd's father was an American soldier. Boyd's mother was a German.

Boyd completed a three-year study acting at the National Theatre School in Rostock, followed by an additional vocal training at the Department of chanson at the Music School in East Berlin Friedrichshain. After working at several small stages in 1973 she came to the Maxim Gorki Theatre in Berlin, where she played for ten years. In addition, she also played first film and television roles for the East German DEFA and Deutscher Fernsehfunk.

Her breakthrough as an actress came in 1981 in the role of the dancer Juliette Martens in István Szabó's Oscar-winning film Mephisto starring Klaus Maria Brandauer.

After her exit visa had been granted, in 1983, she moved with her son to West Germany and played on West German theater stages. She occurred in the popular TV-Series Ein Fall für zwei and also in the television series Die Sitte. In the 1990s she moderated various TV formats.

Awards 
 1993: Hersfeld-Preis

Filmography (selection) 
 1969: Zeit zu leben
 1974: Visa für Ocantros (TV film)
 1976: Soviel Lieder, soviel Worte
 1977: Die Marquise (TV film)
 1978: Oh, diese Tante (TV film)
 1978: Das unsichtbare Visier: King-Kong-Grippe (TV series)
 1979: Chiffriert an Chef – Ausfall Nr. 5
 1980: Früher Sommer (TV film)
 1981: Mephisto
 1982: Monsieur bleibt im Schatten (TV film)
 1986: Roncalli (TV series)
 1986: Deutsche sind weiß, Neger können keine Deutschen sein (TV documentary)
 1987: Duett in Bonn (TV series)
 1988:  (TV series)
 1996: Das Siegel des Todes (TV film)
 1998: Geraubte Unschuld (TV film)
 1988: Jenseits von Blau
 2001-2006: Die Sitte (TV series)
 2006: Himmel über Australien (TV film)
 2008: A Year Ago in Winter
 2011: The Family (TV film)

External links 
 
 Agency entry of the actress, with photo
 Official Homepage of Karin Boyd
 Karin Boyd Filmography in: The New York Times

References 

1953 births
Living people
German television actresses
German stage actresses
Actresses from Berlin
20th-century German actresses
21st-century German actresses